The 2017–18 Deportivo Alavés season sees the club participating in La Liga and the Copa del Rey.

Current squad

Out on loan

Pre-season and friendlies

|}

Competitions

Overall

La Liga

League table

Matches

Copa del Rey

Round of 32

Round of 16

Quarter-finals

Statistics

Appearances and goals
Last updated on 19 May 2018

|-
! colspan=14 style=background:#dcdcdc; text-align:center|Goalkeepers

|-
! colspan=14 style=background:#dcdcdc; text-align:center|Defenders

|-
! colspan=14 style=background:#dcdcdc; text-align:center|Midfielders

|-
! colspan=14 style=background:#dcdcdc; text-align:center|Forwards

|-
! colspan=14 style=background:#dcdcdc; text-align:center| Players who have made an appearance or had a squad number this season but have left the club

|-
|}

Cards
Accounts for all competitions. Last updated on 26 December 2017.

Clean sheets
Last updated on 26 December 2017.

References

Deportivo Alavés seasons
Deportivo Alavés